The Lashly Formation is a Late Triassic (Carnian) geologic formation in Victoria Land of Antarctica. The formation has provided fossil flora and indeterminate reptiles and dicynodonts.

Tuff found in combination with Dicroidium fragments were interpreted as the result of a forest fire during the Triassic.

Description 
The Lashly Formation comprises carbonaceous mudstones and conglomeratic sandstones deposited in channels and on floodplains of a meandering fluvial environment.

Lashly member C consists of fining-upward cycles of medium- to fine-grained sandstone grading upward into carbonaceous siltstone and mudstone, and thin coal beds. Quartz pebbles and cobbles and mudstone clasts occur near the base of major sandstone units. Irregular lenses of coal occur along bedding planes and over large scours. Dicroidium fronds and other plant fragments are common in carbonaceous beds.

Fossil content 
The following fossils have been reported from the formation:
 Therapsids
 Dicynodontia indet.
 Reptiles
 Reptilia indet.
 Flora
 Craterisporites rotundus
 Playfordiaspora crenulata
 Alisporites spp.
 Aratrisporites spp.
 Dicroidium sp.
 Uvaesporites spp.

See also 
 List of fossiliferous stratigraphic units in Antarctica
 Fremouw Formation

References

Bibliography 
 
 

Geologic formations of Antarctica
Triassic System of Antarctica
Carnian Stage
Sandstone formations
Siltstone formations
Mudstone formations
Conglomerate formations
Fluvial deposits
Paleontology in Antarctica